

Ka 

 Susan Kadis b. 1953 first elected in 2004 as Liberal member for Thornhill, Ontario.
 Thomas Erlin Kaiser b. 1863 first elected in 1925 as Conservative member for Ontario, Ontario.
 Randy Kamp b. 1953 first elected in 2004 as Conservative member for Dewdney—Alouette, British Columbia.
 Darshan Kang b. 1951 first elected in 2015 as Liberal member for Calgary Skyview, Alberta. 
 Andrew Kania b. 1967 first elected in 2008 as Liberal member for Brampton West, Ontario. 
 Robert Phillip Kaplan b. 1936 first elected in 1968 as Liberal member for Don Valley, Ontario.
 Nancy Karetak-Lindell b. 1957 first elected in 1997 as Liberal member for Nunavut, Northwest Territories.
 Jim Karpoff b. 1937 first elected in 1988 as New Democratic Party member for Surrey North, British Columbia.
 Jim Karygiannis b. 1955 first elected in 1988 as Liberal member for Scarborough—Agincourt, Ontario.
 Charles Edwin Kaulbach b. 1834 first elected in 1878 as Conservative member for Lunenburg, Nova Scotia.
 William Frederic Kay b. 1876 first elected in 1911 as Liberal member for Missisquoi, Quebec.
 Arielle Kayabaga first elected in 2021 as Liberal member for London West, Ontario.

Ke 

 James Russell Keays b. 1913 first elected in 1958 as Progressive Conservative member for Îles-de-la-Madeleine, Quebec.
 Gerald Keddy b. 1953 first elected in 1997 as Progressive Conservative member for South Shore, Nova Scotia.
 Francis Henry Keefer b. 1860 first elected in 1917 as Unionist member for Port Arthur and Kenora, Ontario.
 Thomas Twining Keefler b. 1824 first elected in 1882 as Liberal member for Lunenburg, Nova Scotia.
 Joseph Keeler b. 1824 first elected in 1867 as Liberal-Conservative member for Northumberland East, Ontario.
 Cyril Keeper b. 1943 first elected in 1980 as New Democratic Party member for Winnipeg—St. James, Manitoba.
 Tina Keeper b. 1962 first elected in 2006 as Liberal member for Churchill, Manitoba. 
 James Kelleher b. 1930 first elected in 1984 as Progressive Conservative member for Sault Ste. Marie, Ontario.
 Donald Ferdinand Kellner b. 1879 first elected in 1921 as Progressive member for Edmonton East, Alberta.
 Mike Kelloway first elected in 2019 as Liberal member for Cape Breton—Canso, Nova Scotia.
 Matthew Kellway b. 1964 first elected in 2011 as New Democratic Party member for Beaches—East York, Ontario. 
 Fenwick Lionel Kelly b. 1863 first elected in 1923 as Liberal member for North Cape Breton and Victoria, Nova Scotia.
 Leonard Patrick Kelly b. 1927 first elected in 1962 as Liberal member for York West, Ontario.
 Norman Kelly b. 1941 first elected in 1980 as Liberal member for Scarborough Centre, Ontario.
 Pat Kelly b. 1971 first elected in 2015 as Conservative member for Calgary Rocky Ridge, Alberta. 
 Albert Edward Kemp b. 1858 first elected in 1900 as Conservative member for Toronto East, Ontario.
 Bill Kempling b. 1921 first elected in 1972 as Progressive Conservative member for Halton—Wentworth, Ontario.
 George Kempt b. 1821 first elected in 1867 as Liberal member for Victoria South, Ontario.
 Arthur Samuel Kendall b. 1861 first elected in 1900 as Liberal member for Cape Breton, Nova Scotia.
 James Kendry b. 1845 first elected in 1896 as Conservative member for Peterborough West, Ontario.
 Cyril Kennedy b. 1915 first elected in 1957 as Progressive Conservative member for Colchester—Hants, Nova Scotia.
 Donald MacBeth Kennedy b. 1884 first elected in 1921 as Progressive member for Edmonton West, Alberta.
 Dougald Kennedy b. 1869 first elected in 1921 as Progressive member for Port Arthur and Kenora, Ontario.
 Gerard Kennedy first elected in 2008 as Liberal member for Parkdale—High Park, Ontario.
 James Buckham Kennedy b. 1844 first elected in 1904 as Liberal member for New Westminster, British Columbia.
 John Wilfred Kennedy b. 1879 first elected in 1919 as United Farmers of Ontario-Labour member for Glengarry and Stormont, Ontario.
 Orvis A. Kennedy b. 1907 first elected in 1938 as Social Credit member for Edmonton East, Alberta.
 William Costello Kennedy b. 1868 first elected in 1917 as Laurier Liberal member for Essex North, Ontario.
 William Walker Kennedy b. 1882 first elected in 1925 as Conservative member for Winnipeg South Centre, Manitoba.
 Jason Kenney b. 1968  first elected in 1997 as Reform member for Calgary Southeast, Alberta.
 Thomas Edward Kenny b. 1833 first elected in 1887 as Conservative member for Halifax, Nova Scotia.
 Peter Kent b. 1943 first elected in 2008 as Conservative member for Thornhill, Ontario.
 William Richard Kent b. 1905 first elected in 1949 as Liberal member for Humber—St. George's, Newfoundland and Labrador.
 Allan Kerpan b. 1954 first elected in 1993 as Reform member for Moose Jaw—Lake Centre, Saskatchewan.
 Greg Kerr b. 1947 first elected in 2008 as Conservative member for West Nova, Nova Scotia. 
 William Kerr b. 1836 first elected in 1874 as Liberal member for Northumberland West, Ontario.
 Stan Keyes b. 1953 first elected in 1988 as Liberal member for Hamilton West, Ontario.

Kh 
 Iqra Khalid b. 1985 first elected in 2015 as Liberal member for Mississauga—Erin Mills, Ontario. 
 Wajid Khan b. 1946 first elected in 2004 as Liberal member for Mississauga—Streetsville, Ontario.
 Kamal Khera b. 1989 first elected in 2015 as Liberal member for Brampton West, Ontario.

Ki 

 Thomas Joseph Kickham b. 1901 first elected in 1949 as Liberal member for King's, Prince Edward Island.
 Edward Kidd b. 1849 first elected in 1900 as Conservative member for Carleton, Ontario.
 Thomas Ashmore Kidd b. 1889 first elected in 1945 as Progressive Conservative member for Kingston City, Ontario.
 Eric Kierans b. 1914 first elected in 1968 as Liberal member for Duvernay, Quebec.
 Alexandre Edouard Kierzkowski b. 1816 first elected in 1867 as Liberal member for St. Hyacinthe, Quebec.
 Robert Kilger b. 1944 first elected in 1988 as Liberal member for Stormont—Dundas, Ontario.
 David Kilgour b. 1941 first elected in 1979 as Progressive Conservative member for Edmonton—Strathcona, Alberta.
 Frank Killam b. 1843 first elected in 1869 as Liberal member for Yarmouth, Nova Scotia.
 Thomas Killam b. 1802 first elected in 1867 as Anti-Confederate member for Yarmouth, Nova Scotia.
 Marie Thérèse Killens b. 1927 first elected in 1979 as Liberal member for Saint-Michel, Quebec.
 Francis Edwin Kilvert b. 1838 first elected in 1878 as Conservative member for Hamilton, Ontario.
 Lawrence Kindt b. 1901 first elected in 1958 as Progressive Conservative member for Macleod, Alberta.
 Alex Kindy b. 1930 first elected in 1984 as Progressive Conservative member for Calgary East, Alberta.
 Frederick John King b. 1923 first elected in 1979 as Progressive Conservative member for Okanagan—Similkameen, British Columbia.
 George Gerald King b. 1836 first elected in 1878 as Liberal member for Queen's, New Brunswick.
 James Horace King b. 1873 first elected in 1922 as Liberal member for Kootenay East, British Columbia.
 John Warwick King b. 1856 first elected in 1921 as Progressive member for Huron North, Ontario.
 William Lyon Mackenzie King b. 1874 first elected in 1908 as Liberal member for Waterloo North, Ontario.
 John James Kinley b. 1881 first elected in 1935 as Liberal member for Queens—Lunenburg, Nova Scotia.
 Joseph Robbins Kinney b. 1839 first elected in 1882 as Liberal member for Yarmouth, Nova Scotia.
 J. Ralph Kirk b. 1895 first elected in 1936 as Liberal member for Antigonish—Guysborough, Nova Scotia.
 John Angus Kirk b. 1837 first elected in 1874 as Liberal member for Guysborough, Nova Scotia.
 Thomas Andrew Murray Kirk b. 1906 first elected in 1949 as Liberal member for Digby—Yarmouth, Nova Scotia.
 Gordon Kirkby b. 1958 first elected in 1993 as Liberal member for Prince Albert—Churchill River, Saskatchewan.
 George Airey Kirkpatrick b. 1841 first elected in 1870 as Conservative member for Frontenac, Ontario.
 Thomas Kirkpatrick b. 1805 first elected in 1867 as Conservative member for Frontenac, Ontario.
 Robert Gordon Kitchen first elected in 2015 as Conservative member for Souris—Moose Mountain, Saskatchewan.

Kl 

 Milton L. Klein b. 1910 first elected in 1963 as Liberal member for Cartier, Quebec.
 James Bell Klock b. 1856 first elected in 1896 as Conservative member for Nipissing, Ontario.
 Christian Kloepfer b. 1847 first elected in 1896 as Conservative member for Wellington South, Ontario.

Km
 Tom Kmiec b. 1981 first elected in 2015 as Conservative member for Calgary Shepard, Alberta.

Kn 

 Roy Knight b. 1891 first elected in 1945 as Cooperative Commonwealth Federation member for Saskatoon City, Saskatchewan.
 Bill Knight b. 1947 first elected in 1971 as New Democratic Party member for Assiniboia, Saskatchewan.
 John Evans Knowles b. 1914 first elected in 1957 as Progressive Conservative member for Norfolk, Ontario.
 Stanley Knowles b. 1908 first elected in 1942 as Cooperative Commonwealth Federation member for Winnipeg North Centre, Manitoba.
 William David Knowles b. 1908 first elected in 1968 as Progressive Conservative member for Norfolk—Haldimand, Ontario.
 William Erskine Knowles b. 1872 first elected in 1906 as Liberal member for Assiniboia West, Saskatchewan.
 Andrew Knox b. 1866 first elected in 1917 as Liberal member for Prince Albert, Saskatchewan.
 Gar Knutson b. 1956 first elected in 1993 as Liberal member for Elgin—Norfolk, Ontario.

Ko 

 Ed Komarnicki b. 1949 first elected in 2004 as Conservative member for Souris—Moose Mountain, Saskatchewan.
 Margaret Konantz b. 1899 first elected in 1963 as Liberal member for Winnipeg South, Manitoba.
 Derrek Konrad b. 1943 first elected in 1997 as Reform member for Prince Albert, Saskatchewan.
 Stanley Korchinski b. 1929 first elected in 1958 as Progressive Conservative member for Mackenzie, Saskatchewan.
 Maka Kotto b. 1961 first elected in 2004 as Bloc Québécois member for Saint-Lambert, Quebec.
 Allan Koury b. 1930 first elected in 1988 as Progressive Conservative member for Hochelaga—Maisonneuve, Quebec.
 Annie Koutrakis first elected in 2019 as Liberal member for Vimy, Quebec.

Kr 

 Karen Kraft Sloan b. 1952 first elected in 1993 as Liberal member for York—Simcoe, Ontario.
 Michael Kram b. 1978 first elected in 2019 as Conservative member Regina—Wascana, Saskatchewan. 
 Daryl Kramp b. 1947 first elected in 2004 as Conservative member for Prince Edward—Hastings, Ontario.
 Shelby Kramp-Neuman first elected in 2021 as Conservative member Hastings—Lennox and Addington, Ontario. 
 Hugo Kranz b. 1834 first elected in 1878 as Conservative member for Waterloo North, Ontario.
 Lyle Kristiansen b. 1939 first elected in 1980 as New Democratic Party member for Kootenay West, British Columbia.

Ku 

 John Kucherepa b. 1919 first elected in 1957 as Progressive Conservative member for High Park, Ontario.
 Walter Frederick Kuhl b. 1905 first elected in 1935 as Social Credit member for Jasper—Edson, Alberta.
 Harry Kuntz b. 1929 first elected in 1972 as Progressive Conservative member for Battle River, Alberta.
 Damien Kurek first elected in 2019 as Conservative member for Battle River—Crowfoot, Alberta. 
 John Kushner b. 1923 first elected in 1979 as Progressive Conservative member for Calgary East, Alberta.
 Stephanie Kusie b. 1973 first elected in 2017 as Conservative member for Calgary Midnapore, Alberta.
 Irek Kusmierczyk b. 1978 first elected in 2019 as Liberal member for  Windsor—Tecumseh, Ontario.

Kw
Jenny Kwan b. 1967 first elected in 2015 as New Democratic Party member for Vancouver East, British Columbia.

Ky 

 George William Kyte b. 1864 first elected in 1908 as Liberal member for Richmond, Nova Scotia.

K